The Sarabi dog or Persian mastiff, is a large breed of livestock guardian dog from Iran, originating from the Sarab County, Sarabi dogs have been used for centuries by local shepherds to protect herds of sheep and goats from bears, wolves, jackals and other local predators. The Persian mastiff is calm, controlled, independent, powerful and protective, the breed is also used to compete in staged dog fights. The breed is considered one of the oldest and most powerful indigenous dog breeds in Iran; the larger and heavier an individual dog is, the greater its value.

See also
 Dogs portal
 List of dog breeds

References

Further reading 
 
 

Livestock guardian dogs
Dog breeds originating in Asia